SFHS can refer to:

High schools
 Saint Francis High School (Athol Springs), New York
 Saint Francis High School (La Cañada Flintridge), California
 Saint Francis High School (Mountain View), California
 Saint Francis High School (St. Francis, Wisconsin)
 St. Francis High School (Wheaton, Illinois)
 Santa Fe High School (disambiguation)
 Segerstrom Fundamental High School, Orange County, California
 Seventy-First High School, Fayetteville, North Carolina
 South Fork High School, Stuart, Florida
 South Forsyth High School, Georgia
 Spanish Fort High School, Spanish Fort, Alabama
 Spring-Ford High School, Royersford, Pennsylvania

Associations
 Shropshire Family History Society, genealogical society in the United Kingdom
 Society for French Historical Studies, American society for the study of French history
 Suffolk Family History Society, a genealogical society in the United Kingdom
 The Swedish-Finn Historical Society, a genealogical society in the United States